Ximenia roigii is a species of plant in the family Olacaceae. It is endemic to Cuba. It is threatened by habitat loss.

References

Flora of Cuba
Olacaceae
Vulnerable plants
Endemic flora of Cuba
Taxonomy articles created by Polbot